Julia's ground snake (Erythrolamprus juliae) is a species of snake in the family Colubridae. The species is found in the Caribbean, on the Lesser Antilles islands of Dominica and Guadeloupe.

Etymology
The specific name, juliae, is in honor of Julia Cope Collins (1866–1959), who was the only child of American herpetologist Edward Drinker Cope, the describer of this species.

Subspecies
The nominate subspecies, E. j. juliae, is endemic to Dominica, where it may be found everywhere but the highest elevations.  E. j. copeae is found on numerous islands in the Guadeloupean archipelago, while E. j. mariae is restricted to the Guadeloupean island of Marie-Galante.  Its relative rareness in Guadeloupe is attributed to the presence of the mongoose, which is absent from Dominica.

Description
E. juliae can reach half a meter (20 inches) in total length (including tail).  Its coloration is typically white or yellowish flecks on a glossy dark ground color, but some individuals are uniformly dark.

Diet
Julia's ground snake eats lizards, frogs, and insects.

Defensive behavior
E. juliae is harmless to humans, but may release a foul-smelling cloacal secretion if provoked.

References

Further reading

Barbour T (1914). "A Contribution to the Zoögeography of the West Indies, with Especial Reference to Amphibians and Reptiles". Memoirs of the Museum of Comparative Zoölogy 44 (2): 205-359 + one plate. (Leimadophis mariae, new species, p. 340).
Cope ED (1879). "Eleventh Contribution to the Herpetology of Tropical America". Proc. Amer. Philosophical Soc. 18: 261–277. ("Aporophis juliæ ", new species, pp. 274–275).
Malhotra, Anita; Thorpe, Roger S. (1999). Reptiles and Amphibians of the Eastern Caribbean. London and Oxford: Macmillan Education Ltd. . (pp. 39–40, 84, 86–88, 123).
Powell, Robert; Henderson, Robert W. (2005). "Conservation Status of Lesser Antillean Reptiles". Iguana 12 (2): 63–77.
Schwartz A, Thomas R (1975). A Check-list of West Indian Amphibians and Reptiles. Carnegie Museum of Natural History Special Publication No. 1. Pittsburgh, Pennsylvania: Carnegie Museum of Natural History. 216 pp. (Dromicus juliae, p. 182).

External links
.
Liophis juliae at the Encyclopedia of Life.
.

juliae
Snakes of the Caribbean
Reptiles of Dominica
Reptiles of Guadeloupe
Reptiles described in 1879
Taxa named by Edward Drinker Cope